Valiabdula Guseynovich Magomedov (born 21 June 1986) is a Russian former professional football player.

Club career
He made his Russian Football National League debut for FC Anzhi Makhachkala on 29 March 2006 in a game against FC Lada Tolyatti. He played 2 more seasons in the FNL for FC Baltika Kaliningrad.

External links
 

1986 births
Footballers from Makhachkala
Living people
Russian footballers
Association football midfielders
FC Dynamo Stavropol players
FC Anzhi Makhachkala players
FC Baltika Kaliningrad players
FC Ufa players